Sarreaus is a municipality in Ourense Province in the Galicia region of north-west Spain.

References  

Municipalities in the Province of Ourense